Hunchback is a descriptive yet derogatory term for a person who has severe kyphosis (from Greek κυφός kyphos, a hump).

Hunchback or The Hunchback may also refer to:

Arts and entertainment
 Hunchback (video game), an arcade and computer game from 1983
 The Hunchback (1914 film), featuring Lillian Gish
 The Hunchback (1997 film) directed by Peter Medak
 The Hunchback (EP), an EP by Kurt Vile & the Violators
 The Hunchback (play), an 1832 London play by James Sheridan Knowles
 Le Bossu (novel) (English: The Hunchback), an 1858 French historical adventure novel by Paul Féval

Other uses
 List of people known as the Hunchback
 "The Hunchback", a nickname of the Ilyushin Il-2, a Soviet World War II ground-attack aircraft
 , a steam-powered gunboat used by the United States Navy
 "The Hunchback", a nickname for the city of Mosul, Iraq (due to the leaning of the minaret of the Great Mosque of al-Nuri) 
 Hunchback gene product, involved in Drosophila embryogenesis

See also
The Hunchback of Notre Dame (disambiguation)
List of hunchbacks in fiction